O. leucocephala may refer to:
 Orchesella leucocephala, Stach, 1923, a springtail species in the genus Orchesella
 Oxyura leucocephala, the white-headed duck, a small stiff-tailed duck species

See also
 Leucocephala (disambiguation)